Munapirtti may refer to:

 Munapirtti (island)
 Munapirtti (village)

both situated in the municipality of Pyhtää in Southern Finland.